Ahwiaa is a town in the Kwabre East District of the Ashanti Region noted for its wood carvings, arts and crafts.

Location
Ahwiaa is located 9 kilometres from Kumasi along the Kumasi- Mampong Highway N10.

References

See also
 Offinso
 Adanwomase

Populated places in the Ashanti Region